Qaleh-ye Abdollah (also Romanized as Qal‘eh-ye ‘Abdollāh; also known as Qalandarīyeh, Qal’eh Qalandarīyeh, and Qal‘eh-ye ‘Abdollāh Khān) is a village in Taraznahid Rural District, in the Central District of Saveh County, Markazi Province, Iran. At the 2006 census, its population was 58, in 12 families.

References 

Populated places in Saveh County